"Slutwave" is a pejorative applied to female pop music stars who "favor sex appeal – suggestive dancing, scant clothing, explicit lyrics – to promote their career over their actual music."

Origins
The term originated on the satirical music blog Hipster Runoff (2008–2013) and subsequently gained wider usage.

Notable artists 
Madonna, according to LA Weeklys K.C. Libman, is the "godmother" of slutwave. He explained that this is because she "ushered in a powerful era of female sexuality in pop music". Other singers described as "slutwave" include Katy Perry, Kesha, Rihanna, Peaches, Lady Gaga, Britney Spears, Miley Cyrus, Cardi B.

See also
 Music criticism
 Rockism and poptimism

References

Pop music
Sexuality in popular culture
Types of marketing